Adams Creek is a  long 2nd order tributary to Dutch Buffalo Creek in Cabarrus County, North Carolina.

Course
Adams Creek rises about 2 miles east-southeast of New Gilead, North Carolina, and then flows southeast to join Dutch Buffalo Creek about 1 mile south of Mount Pleasant.

Watershed
Adams Creek drains  of area, receives about 47.2 in/year of precipitation, has a wetness index of 411.18, and is about 46% forested.

References

Rivers of North Carolina
Rivers of Cabarrus County, North Carolina